Aktapuss is an album by the American rapper Akinyele. It was released in 1999 on Volcano/Jive Records. The album served as the soundtrack to the film of the same name. 

It was modest success, peaking at No. 64 on the Top R&B/Hip-Hop Albums. It made No. 33 on the Top Heatseekers; its single, "Take a Lick", made it to No. 87 on the Hot R&B/Hip-Hop Singles & Tracks and No. 9 on the Hot Rap Singles.

Track listing
"Get Up"- 4:13  
"Pussy Makes the World Go Round"- 4:41  
"Butt Naked"- 4:05  
"Take a Lick"- 3:30  
"Coochie"- 4:15  
"Three"- 4:55  
"Sister, Sister"- 3:20  
"How Do You Feel"- 3:44  
"Sky's the Limit"- 4:24  
"Juan Valdez, Love"- 4:04  
"Sex in the City"- 4:01  
"Ak Da Hoe"- 2:50  
"Really Love Me"- 3:27  
"Down South"- 5:44  
"Messin' with My Cru"- 3:53  
"Sha La La"- 3:53  
"Rather Fuck You"- 2:49  
"Niggas & Bitches"- 3:59  
"Put It in Your Mouth"- 3:21

Samples
Get Up
"Expressions" by Willie Mitchell
Coochie
"Part Time Love" by Gladys Knight & the Pips
Sister, Sister
"Inside My Love" by Jimmy Stewart
"In the Rain" by The Dramatics
Sky's the Limit
"Safari" by Frank Walton
Juan Valdez, Love
"Walk on By" by Arif Mardin
Sex in the City
"Donde Brilla El Sol" by Amanda Miguel
Down South
"Avant De Nous De Dire Adieu" by Jeane Manson
Messin' With My Cru
"Sandy" by David Axelrod
Sha La La
"Revelations" by The Rimshots
Niggas & Bitches
"Got to Find My Own Place" by Stanley Clarke
Put It in Your Mouth
"Fun" by Brick
"I'm Glad You're Mine" by Al Green

References

1999 albums
Akinyele (rapper) albums
Albums produced by Large Professor
Albums produced by Buckwild
Albums produced by Lord Finesse
Volcano Entertainment albums
Jive Records albums